Natalia Semenova (born 7 July 1982) is a Ukrainian discus thrower.

Her personal best throw is 64.70 m achieved in Kiev in 2008.

Competition record

References

1982 births
Living people
People from Horlivka
Ukrainian female discus throwers
Athletes (track and field) at the 2004 Summer Olympics
Athletes (track and field) at the 2008 Summer Olympics
Athletes (track and field) at the 2012 Summer Olympics
Athletes (track and field) at the 2016 Summer Olympics
Olympic athletes of Ukraine
European Athletics Championships medalists
World Athletics Championships athletes for Ukraine
Universiade medalists in athletics (track and field)
Universiade gold medalists for Ukraine
Ukrainian Athletics Championships winners
Medalists at the 2003 Summer Universiade
Athletes (track and field) at the 2020 Summer Olympics
Sportspeople from Donetsk Oblast